The Hunanzhen Dam is a trapezoidal buttress dam on the Qiantang River, located  south of Quzhou in Zhejiang Province, China. The primary purpose of the dam is hydroelectric power generation but it also serves to provide for flood control and irrigation water supply. Construction on the dam began in 1958 but was halted in 1961. It recommenced in 1970, the first generator was operational in 1979 and the project complete in 1980. The original installed capacity of the dam's power plant was 170 MW but the plant was expanded with an additional 100 MW generator, commissioned in 2006.

Design
The dam has 18 buttresses with the spillway section located in the center. The spillway is controlled by five radial gates and within the center four of the six piers supporting the spillway chutes are four outlets. The dam's power stations are located downstream around the natural river bend and water is supplied via a  tunnel. The original power house contains four 42.5 MW Francis turbine-generators and the expansion power house, located just downstream, contains one 100 MW Francis turbine-generator.

See also

List of dams and reservoirs in China
List of major power stations in Zhejiang

References

Dams in China
Hydroelectric power stations in Zhejiang
Buttress dams
Dams completed in 1980